Robert A. Antonioni (born July 15, 1958) is an American attorney and politician who served in the Massachusetts General Court and on the Leominster City Council.

Early life
Antonioni was born on July 15, 1958 in Leominster, Massachusetts. He graduated from the College of the Holy Cross and New England School of Law.

Political career
Antonioni's political career began in 1985 when he ran for a seat on the Leominster City Council. In 1988, Antonioni was elected to the Massachusetts House of Representatives. Four years later he was elected to the Massachusetts Senate. In 2008, Antonioni announced that he was not seeking reelection. He was succeeded by Jennifer Flanagan.

See also
 1993–1994 Massachusetts legislature
 Massachusetts Senate's Worcester and Middlesex district

References

1958 births
College of the Holy Cross alumni
Democratic Party Massachusetts state senators
Democratic Party members of the Massachusetts House of Representatives
New England Law Boston alumni
People from Leominster, Massachusetts
Living people